Luca Pagano (born July 28, 1978 in Treviso) is an Italian-born poker player who finished third place in the Barcelona Open, a European Poker Tour (EPT) event, in 2004. Since then he has reached six more EPT final tables, finishing in the money 20 times, placing him top of the EPT All-Time Leaderboard. He has also placed in two events at the 2006 World Series of Poker.

He was a Team PokerStar PRO member for almost 15 years and, as of 2017, his total live tournament winnings exceed $2,200,000.

Biography 
Pagano attended the information-science branch at the Ca' Foscari University of Venice; quickly his managerial skills took over and the nightlife family-run business was profitably administrated.
The big love for poker comes a little later, during a trip in Slovenia where he played a game in the Casino of Nova Gorica.

He has been a poker professional since 2004, year in which he scored the third place at the EPT Barcelona Open. This rising career takes him to play in the major tournaments having places in the most eminent cities, so that PokerStars chooses to make him the perfect Italian testimonial of the Team Pro. Pagano and PokerStars parted their ways in May 2017, consensually.

Pagano adds to his palmares many successes and builds up a very solid bankroll, rapidly becoming the player with the most in the money placements in all of Italian history.

Together with poker, Pagano is an entrepreneur, Angel Investor, TV commentator and host, main host of the Italian talent and reality show La Casa degli Assi, sponsored by PokerStars and co-owner of Italian professional eSports Team QLASH.

European Poker Tour
In the European Poker Tour, Pagano gained 20 ITM placements with 7 Final Tables. Despite the strong perseverance, he never scored any first place; his best EPT result is third place in Barcelona in 2004.

On September 11, 2008, Pagano was awarded by the European Poker Tour Awards as "The Player of the Year".

Pagano holds the first position in the EPT All-Time Leaderboard with 5.500 points, right before French player Bertrand "ElkY" Grospellier, and holds the second position in the EPT ITM Rank Score - he is the first, however, among Italians; the Global Poker Index has estimated his winnings in about $2,212,339.

Italian Poker Tour

On August 1, 2011 wins for the first time the Italian Poker Tour Sanremo step, gaining a trophy and €210,000 of prize.

As May 2017, at the time of the split from PokerStars, he holds the 8th place in the "All Time Money List" of HendonMob, for a global earnings of $2,212,339.

Pokerstars Festival 
PokerStars Festival since 2017 replaces the Italian Poker Tour format.

World Series of Poker 
Pagano's best placement in the World Series of Poker was in 2006, in the $1.500 Seven Card Stud event, where he reached the 40° place.

Poker related activities
Co-hosted, together with sport commentator Giacomo Valenti, the famous TV show "Poker1Mania", aired, from 2007 to 2013, late night on Italian public television; the show was the first of its kind featuring the professional game of poker in a less technical language and earned a big audience consensus.

Organizes poker events by the Venice Casino, by the detached branch Ca' Noghera, by the Casino Sanremo, Casino Saint-Vincent, Aosta Valley and Nova Gorica.

In mid 2014 he hosted the first edition of talent and reality show La Casa degli Assi, original format by PokerStars produced by Magnolia Italy; this reality was aired for the first time on a terrestrial satellite TV channel and secondly re-aired on the public television, at night.

In March 2015 Luca Pagano hosted the second edition of the talent show, aired late night on public television.

eSports
In late 2016 Luca Pagano announced his entry in the electronic sports frontier with the creation and co-owning, with professional poker player Eugene Katchalov, of a professional team in Italy.

QLASH is one of the most promising professional organizations featuring well known players from the national and international scene in different videogames: Hearthstone, StarCraft, FIFA, Fortnite, Clash Royale, Brawlstars, Vainglory, Call of Duty, Sim Racing and more. In much less time the team has been granted with important recognition in the gaming scene. QLASH is also the first professional Italian team to join the prestigious Dreamhack in Austin, with former member Simone "VKing" Larivera ranking a stellar Top20 position in Hearthstone.

In early 2019 QLASH introduced the QLASH House; a gaming house situated in Treviso, Italy. It houses many of their professional players.

Bibliography

References

External links
 Luca Pagano official site
 PaganoEvents
 Team PokerStars profile
 BlondePoker.com interview
 Team QLASH official website

Computer programmers
Italian poker players
Living people
1978 births